Bloom is an unincorporated community in Ford County, Kansas, United States.  Its post office closed in 1992.  At a 2018 estimate, the community had a population of 94.

History
Bloom was established by Thomas J. Vanderslice and Samuel O. Albright in 1887 or 1888. Vanderslice named it Bloom after his hometown of Bloomsburg, Pennsylvania.  The small town sprang to life when the Rock Island Railroad pushed west.  The town's original train depot can still be found in Bloom.

Bloom's population reached a few hundred in the 1930s but gradually declined since and is now less than 50.  The Bloom High School Badgers  closed in the 1964 when the town's school district merged with that of Minneola, Kansas.

The small town once had a hotel, gas station, restaurant, post office, and lumber yard.  Today, only a grain elevator business and private residences remain.  Wheat farms and ranches surround the small town.

Demographics 
At a 2018 estimate, Bloom, Kansas has a population of 94.  The same estimate also found that there were 37 households, with there being an average of 2.5 people per household.  The median age is estimated to be at 35.8.  The per capita income is estimated to be around $44,295, with about 4.3% of residents below the poverty line.

References

Further reading

External links
 Images of Bloom Wichita State University Library.
 Ford County maps: Current, Historic - KDOT

Unincorporated communities in Ford County, Kansas
Unincorporated communities in Kansas